The 2008 Women's Hockey Setanta Sports Trophy was the second edition of the Setanta Sports Trophy, a women's field hockey tournament. It was held in Dublin, Ireland, from June 11 to 15, 2008, and featured four of the top nations in women's field hockey.

The tournament was held simultaneously with the men's competition.

Competition format
The tournament featured the national teams of Germany, Great Britain, South Africa, and the hosts, Ireland, competing in a round-robin format, with each team playing each other once. Three points were awarded for a win, one for a draw, and none for a loss.

Officials
The following umpires were appointed by the International Hockey Federation to officiate the tournament:

 Jean Duncan (GBR)
 Amy Hassick (USA)
 Philette de Jager (RSA)
 Carol Metchette (IRE)
 Petra Müller (GER)

Results
All times are local (Irish Standard Time).

Preliminary round

Fixtures

Classification round

Third and fourth place

Final

Statistics

Final standings

Goalscorers

References

2008 in women's field hockey
hockey
International women's field hockey competitions hosted by Ireland
Sport in Dublin (city)
June 2008 sports events in Europe